A Provincial Lady is a 1964 Australian television play.

Plot
Daria, seeking to advance the career of husband Alexi, invites his employer to dinner. The Count is a childhood friend who was devoted to Daria.

Cast
Michael Duffield as Alexi Stupendev
Beverley Dunn as Daria Stupendev
Allan Bickford as Misha
Keith Lee as Count Lubin
Martin Magee as Apollo
Louise Homfrey as Vasilvena
William Lloyd as the secretary

Reception
The TV critic for the Sydney Morning Herald thought "the air of leisurely introspection and nostalgia which can confidently be expected in any nineteenth-century Russian play... was only intermittently captured" in the production due in part to the acting and "the obviously contrived and stagey set" but "a certain charm kept coming out like the sun from behind clouds."

References

External links
 

Australian television films
1964 television plays